Finnish Blood Swedish Heart is a 2013 documentary film by Mika Ronkainen about a Finnish father and son revisiting their former home in Sweden. The film won two Jussi Awards (Finnish Oscars) in 2014: Best Documentary and Best Music, and the Dragon Award for Best Nordic Documentary Film at the Göteborg Film Festival in February 2013.

The film was released theatrically in Sweden with the title Ingen riktig finne on 22 March 2013, and in Finland (titled Laulu koti-ikävästä) on 5 April 2013.

Reviews

References

External links
 
 
 

2012 films
2010s Finnish-language films
2010s Swedish-language films
Finnish documentary films
2012 documentary films
Swedish documentary films
2012 multilingual films
Finnish multilingual films
Swedish multilingual films
2010s Swedish films